Deretrachys chilensis is a species of beetle in the family Cerambycidae. It was described by Bosq in 1949.

References

Trachyderini
Beetles described in 1949